Wild Peach Village is a census-designated place (CDP) in Brazoria County, Texas, United States. The population was 2,329 at the 2020 census.

Geography
Wild Peach Village is located in western Brazoria County at  (29.077715, -95.621717). Texas State Highway 36 forms the northeastern edge of the community and leads southeast  to Brazoria and northwest  to West Columbia.

Demographics

As of the 2020 United States census, there were 2,329 people, 941 households, and 670 families residing in the CDP.

As of the census of 2000, there were 2,498 people, 882 households, and 701 families residing in the CDP. The population density was 248.5 people per square mile (96.0/km2). There were 989 housing units at an average density of 98.4/sq mi (38.0/km2). The racial makeup of the CDP was 82.67% White, 9.69% African American, 0.64% Native American, 0.24% Asian, 4.44% from other races, and 2.32% from two or more races. Hispanic or Latino of any race were 10.57% of the population.

There were 882 households, out of which 35.9% had children under the age of 18 living with them, 65.1% were married couples living together, 9.6% had a female householder with no husband present, and 20.5% were non-families. 18.4% of all households were made up of individuals, and 7.1% had someone living alone who was 65 years of age or older. The average household size was 2.83 and the average family size was 3.21.

In the CDP, the population was spread out, with 29.1% under the age of 18, 8.3% from 18 to 24, 27.5% from 25 to 44, 24.1% from 45 to 64, and 10.9% who were 65 years of age or older. The median age was 36 years. For every 100 females, there were 95.8 males. For every 100 females age 18 and over, there were 96.2 males.

The median income for a household in the CDP was $39,919, and the median income for a family was $49,250. Males had a median income of $38,606 versus $23,705 for females. The per capita income for the CDP was $17,087. About 4.7% of families and 8.0% of the population were below the poverty line, including 7.8% of those under age 18 and 7.1% of those age 65 or over.

Education
Wild Peach Village is a part of the Columbia-Brazoria Independent School District.

Schools that serve the area include Wild Peach Elementary School (unincorporated Brazoria County), West Brazos Junior High School (Brazoria), and Columbia High School (West Columbia).

The Texas Legislature assigned the area in Columbia-Brazoria ISD (including Wild Peach Village) to the Brazosport College district.

References

Census-designated places in Brazoria County, Texas
Census-designated places in Texas
Greater Houston